The 1919 Memorial Cup final was the first junior ice hockey championship of the Canadian Amateur Hockey Association. The George Richardson Memorial Trophy champions University of Toronto Schools of the Ontario Hockey Association in Eastern Canada competed against the Abbott Cup champions Regina Pats of the South Saskatchewan Junior Hockey League in Western Canada. In a two-game, total goal series, held at the Arena Gardens in Toronto, Ontario, the University of Toronto Schools won the 1st Memorial Cup, defeating Regina 29 goals to 8.

The final game was delayed by nearly an hour and a half. There were parades in Toronto the same day — for Canadian regiments just returning home from the First World War — and fans were late to their seats because of them.

Winning roster
Jack Aggett, Donald Gunn, Steve Greey, Don Jeffery, Richard Kearns, Dunc Munro, Langton Rowell, Joe Sullivan.  Coach: Frank Carroll

References

External links
 Memorial Cup
 Canadian Hockey League

Mem
Ice hockey competitions in Toronto
Memorial Cup tournaments
1919 in Ontario
1910s in Toronto